Rodney Ewart Soher (27 November 1893 – 25 January 1983) was a British bobsledder who competed during the early 1920s. He won a silver medal in the four-man event at the 1924 Winter Olympics in Chamonix.

Personal life

Soher shared a home in Beverly Hills with actor Edmund Gwenn.

References
Bobsleigh four-man Olympic medalists for 1924, 1932-56, and since 1964
DatabaseOlympics.com profile
Wallenchinsky, David. (1984). "Bobsled: Four-Man". In The Complete Book the Olympics: 1896-1980. New York: Penguin Books. p. 559.

1893 births
1983 deaths
Bobsledders at the 1924 Winter Olympics
British male bobsledders
Olympic medalists in bobsleigh
Medalists at the 1924 Winter Olympics
Olympic silver medallists for Great Britain